Thomas Alexander Hugh McFarlane (2 May 1887 – 1 November 1952) was an Australian rules footballer who played for .

Football 
McFarlane debuted for Port Adelaide during the 1909 SAFL season. He would captain the club in the South Australian Football League seasons immediately before and after World War I.

Personal life 
McFarlane was the 15th child of Alexander Macfarlane, an immigrant from Scotland, and Mary Ann Tyzack who was born in Port Adelaide.

His uncle, Samuel Tyzack, was a foundation player for Port Adelaide in 1870.

Alex was the uncle of Bill McFarlane who played over 100 games for Port Adelaide during the 1940s.

He married Olive May Hobbs on 18 December 1911 at St. Aiden’s Church, Marden South Australia. 

Olive and Alex had seven children. Alexander Steer McFarlane 1913; Daphne May McFarlane (1914-1917); Ronald George McFarlane 1916; Olive Valerie McFarlane 1917; Harold McFarlane (1919-1921); Kenneth Malcom 1924; and Joan Louise McFarlane 1925.

Death 
Alex McFarlane died in Alice Springs on 1 November 1952.

Reputation 
Tom Leahy described him as being "Tremendously strong, played very fairly, but very hard. I was against him many times, and he was a tough man to beat."

References

Australian people of Scottish descent
Port Adelaide Football Club (SANFL) players
Port Adelaide Football Club players (all competitions)
1887 births
1952 deaths
Australian rules footballers from South Australia